Than To is a tambon (subdistrict) of Than To District, in Yala Province, Thailand. In 2018 it had a total population of 5,183 people.

History
The subdistrict was created effective March 30, 1977 by splitting off 5 administrative villages from Mae Wat.

Administration

Central administration
The tambon is subdivided into 7 administrative villages (muban).

Local administration
The whole area of the subdistrict is covered by the subdistrict administrative organization (SAO) Than To (องค์การบริหารส่วนตำบลธารโต).

References

External links
Thaitambon.com on Than To
Than To subdistrict administrative organization

Tambon of Yala Province
Populated places in Yala province